Genesis Revisited II is the 22nd studio album by musician Steve Hackett, released on 22 October 2012 by Inside Out Music label. It is a sequel to his 1996 album Genesis Revisited and largely consists of reworked versions of songs originally by Genesis with a variety of guest vocalists.

Track listing

Personnel

Steve Hackett – guitars, vocals (disc 1, track 3 – V: "Willow Farm"; disc 2, track 10)
Mikael Åkerfeldt – vocals (disc 1, track 3 – I: "Lover's Leap" & IV: "How Dare I Be So Beautiful?")
Nad Sylvan – vocals (disc 1, track 1 & 8; disc 2, track 4)
Nik Kershaw – vocals (disc 1, track 4)
Conrad Keely – vocals (disc 1, track 3 – III: "Ikhnaton and Itsacon and Their Band of Merry Men")
Amanda Lehmann – guitar, vocals (disc 2, tracks 3, 5, 8 & 11)
Francis Dunnery – guitar, vocals (disc 1, tracks 3 – VII: "As Sure As Eggs Is Eggs (Aching Men's Feet)" & 5)
Steven Wilson – guitar (disc 2, track 11), vocals (disc 1, track 9) 
Jakko Jakszyk – guitar, vocals (disc 2, track 3)
Roine Stolt – guitar (disc 2, track 2)
Steve Rothery – guitar (disc 1, track 4)
Djabe – (Ferenc Kovács – trumpet, violin, vocals, Attila Égerházi – guitar, percussion, Zoltán Kovács – piano, keyboards, Tamás Barabás – bass guitar, Szilárd Banai – drums) : (disc 2, track 10) 
Roger King – keyboards (disc 1, tracks 1 & 3–10; disc 2, tracks 1–11)
Simon Collins (Phil Collins' son) – keyboard, vocals (disc 1, track 3 – II: "The Guaranteed Eternal Sanctuary Man" & VI: "Apocalypse in 9/8")
Dave Kerzner – keyboards (disc 1, track 3)
Nick Magnus – keyboards (disc 2, track 10)
Neal Morse – keyboards, vocals (disc 2, track 2)
Jo Lehmann – backing vocals
Dick Driver – double bass (disc 1, tracks 1 & 10; disc 2, tracks 1 & 9)
John Wetton – bass, guitar, vocals (disc 2, track 8)
Phil Mulford – bass (disc 2, tracks 1 & 8)
Nick Beggs – bass, Chapman stick (disc 1, track 9; disc 2, tracks 4, 7 & 11)
Lee Pomeroy – bass, Chapman stick (disc 1, tracks 3–8; disc 2, track 2)
Gary O'Toole – drums, percussion (disc 1, tracks 1, 4, & 6–10; disc 2, tracks 1, 2, 4–11), vocals (disc 1, track 6 & 7; disc 2, track 1, 4)
Jeremy Stacey – drums (disc 1, track 3 & 5)
Rachel Ford – cello (disc 1, track 1; disc 2, tracks 1 & 9)
Christine Townsend – violin, viola (disc 1, track 1 & 9; disc 2, tracks 1 & 9)
John Hackett – flute (disc 1, tracks 1, 4, 5 & 10; disc 2, tracks 2 & 9)
Rob Townsend – saxophone, flute and blown sundries (disc 1, tracks 5, 8 & 9; disc 2, tracks 1, 7 & 11)
Photographic artwork by Maurizio and Angéla Vicedomini

Genesis Revisited II: Selection

Genesis Revisited II: Selection is a selection of songs that appear on the 2012 cover album by musician Steve Hackett. It was released in May 2013 by Inside Out Music. It includes eight of the songs included on the original album, plus a previously unreleased version of "Carpet Crawlers"; featuring former Genesis vocalist Ray Wilson.

Track listing

"Selection" Personnel

 Lee Pomeroy - bass (track 1, 3, 4)
 Ray Wilson - vocals (track 1)
 Nick Beggs - bass (track 2, 6, 7)
 Nad Sylvan - vocals (track 2)
 John Hackett - flute (track 3, 4)
 Steve Rothery - guitar (track 3)
 Nick Kershaw - vocals (track 3)
 Jeremy Stacey - drums (track 4)
 Rob Townsend - soprano saxophone (track 4, 6, 9), whistle (track 4, 6, 7)
 Francis Dunnery - vocals (track 4)
 Amanda Lehmann - harmony vocals (track 5, 8), vocals (track 6)
 Jakko Jakszyk - vocals (track 5)
 Steven Wilson - guitar (track 6), vocals (track 7)
 Christine Townsend - violin, viola (track 7, 9)
 Phil Mulford - bass (track 8, 9)
 John Wetton - vocals (track 8)
 Rachel Ford - cello (track 9)
 Dick Driver - double bass (track 9)
 Gary O'Toole - vocals (track 9)

References

External links
Official site
Allmusic page
Discogs page

2012 albums
Steve Hackett albums
2013 albums
Genesis (band) tribute albums
Inside Out Music albums